Stega River may refer to:
 Stega, a tributary of the Bistra in Mureș County, Romania
 Stega River (Bistrița), in Bistrița-Năsăud County, Romania